Roscoea megalantha is a species of flowering plant in the ginger family - Zingiberaceae native to Bhutan and India. It was formerly determined as a part of Roscoea purpurea but it was described as a separate species in 2017

Etymology
The plant was given its scientific name for its large flowers.

Range
Roscoea megalantha occurs in the eastern parts of Bhutan and Arunachal Pradesh in India from 1800 to 3500m above the sea level.

References

Flora of Bhutan
megalantha